This is a list of notable individuals and organizations who voiced their endorsement of Donald Trump as the Republican Party's presidential nominee for the 2024 U.S. presidential election.

Former Executive Branch officials

Katie Arrington, Under Secretary of Defense for A&S CISO (2019–2022)
Steve Bannon, Senior Counselor to the President (2017)
 Gary Bauer, Under Secretary of Education (1985–1987)
Steven Cheung, Special Assistant to the President (2017–2018)
Boris Epshteyn, White House Assistant Director of Communications (2017)
Michael Flynn, U.S. National Security Advisor (2017)
Sebastian Gorka, Deputy Assistant to the President (2017)
Thomas Homan, Acting Director of the U.S. Immigration and Customs Enforcement (2017–2018)
Brian Jack, White House Political Director (2019–2021)
Keith Kellogg, Acting U.S. National Security Advisor (2017)
 Jeffrey Lord, White House Associate Political Director (1987–1988)
Peter McCoy Jr., U.S. Attorney for South Carolina (2020–2021)
  John McEntee, Director of the White House Presidential Personnel Office (2020–2021)
Ed McMullen, Ambassador to Switzerland and Liechtenstein (2017–2021)
Robert C. O'Brien, U.S. National Security Advisor (2019–2021)
 Kash Patel, Secretary of Defense Chief of Staff (2020–2021)
Lynne Patton, Administrator of the U.S. Department of Housing and Urban Development for Region II (2017–2021)
Dan Scavino, White House Deputy Chief of Staff (2020–2021)
 Stephen Stepanek, General Services Administration New England Administrator (2018)
Russell Vought, Office of Management and Budget Director (2019–2021)
 Matthew Whitaker, Acting United States Attorney General (2018-2019)

U.S. Senators

Lindsey Graham, South Carolina (2003–present)
Markwayne Mullin, Oklahoma (2023–present)
Eric Schmitt, Missouri (2023–present)
Tommy Tuberville, Alabama (2021–present)
J. D. Vance, Ohio (2023–present)

U.S. Representatives

 Jim Banks, IN-03 (2017–present) and Candidate running for United States Senate
 Andy Biggs, AZ-05 (2017–present)
 Josh Brecheen, OK-02 (2023–present)
Lauren Boebert, CO-03 (2021–present)
 Mike Bost, IL-12 (2015–present)
 Mike Carey, OH-15 (2021–present)
 Andrew Clyde, GA-09 (2021–present)
 Eli Crane, AZ-02 (2023–present)
 Chuck Fleischmann, TN-03 (2011–present)
 Russell Fry, SC-07 (2023–present)
 Matt Gaetz, FL-01 (2017–present)
 Paul Gosar, AZ-09 (2011–present)
 Tony Gonzales, TX-23 (2021–present)
 Marjorie Taylor Greene, GA-14 (2021–present)
 Harriet Hageman, WY-AL (2023–present)
 Clay Higgins, LA-03 (2017–present)
 Richard Hudson, NC-08 (2013–present)
 Wesley Hunt, TX-38 (2023–present)
 Ronny Jackson, TX-13 (2021–present)
 Jim Jordan, OH-04 (2007–present)
 Anna Paulina Luna, Fl-13 (2023–present)
 Mary Miller, IL-15 (2021–present)
 Max Miller, OH-07 (2023–present)
 Alex Mooney, WV-02 (2015–present)
 Barry Moore, AL-02 (2021–present)
 Troy Nehls, TX-22 (2021–present)
 George Santos, NY-03 (2023–present)
 Elise Stefanik, NY-21 (2015–present); HRC chair (2021–present)
 Dale Strong, AL-05 (2023–present)
William Timmons, SC-04 (2019–present)
 Jeff Van Drew, NJ-02 (2019–present)
Joe Wilson, SC-02 (2001–present)

Former Representatives
 Rod Blum, IA-01 (2015-2019)
 Madison Cawthorn, NC-11 (2021–2023)
 Connie Conway, CA-22 (2022–2023)
 Jason Lewis, MN-02 (2017–2019)

Governors

Jim Justice, West Virginia (2017–present)
Henry McMaster, South Carolina (2017–present)

Former
Sarah Palin, Alaska (2006–2009)

State executive officials

Daniel Cameron, KY Attorney General (2019–present)
Pamela Evette, SC Lieutenant Governor (2019–present)
Curtis Loftis, SC Treasurer (2011–present)
Sid Miller, TX Agriculture Commissioner (2015–present)
Riley Moore, WV State Treasurer (2021–present) and Candidate for West Virginia's 2nd congressional district
Dan Patrick, TX Lieutenant Governor (2015–present)
Ken Paxton, TX Attorney General (2015–present)

Former
André Bauer, SC Lieutenant Governor (2003–2011)
Adam Laxalt, NV Attorney General (2015–2019)
Josh Mandel, OH Treasurer (2011–2019)

State Legislators

Carolina Amesty, FL House (2022–present)
Robert Auth, NJ Assembly (2014–present)
Thomas Beach, SC House (2022–present)
Steve Bradley, IA House (2021–present)
Amanda Chase, VA Senate (2016–present)
Mark Cisneros, IA House (2021–present)
Cindy Golding, IA House (2023–present)
Joe Gruters, FL Senate (2018–present) and Florida GOP chair (2019–2023)
Heather Hora, IA House (2023–present)
Craig Johnson, IA House (2023–present)
Bobby Kaufmann, IA House (2013–present)
Charlie McClintock, IA Senate (2021–present)
Bob McDermott, HI House (1996–2002, 2012-present)
Brad Sherman, IA House (2023–present)
Jeff Reichman, IA Senate (2021–present)
Wendy Rogers, AZ Senate (2021–present)
Anne Osmundson, IA House (2019–present)
Mike Stuart, WV Senate (2022–present) and U.S. Attorney for WV's Southern District (2018–2022)
Samuel D. Thompson, NJ Senate (2012–present) (Democratic)
Derek Wulf, IA House (2023–present)

Former
Darren Bailey, IL Senate (2021–2023)
Mark Finchem, AZ House (2015–2023)
Candice Keller, OH House (2016–2020)
Kevin Lundberg, CO Senate (2009–2019)
Jim Marchant, NV Assembly (2016–2018)
Dave Williams, CO House (2017–2023)

Local and county officials
Michele Fiore, Nye County, NV Justice of the Peace (2022–present)
Vito Fossella, Borough President of Staten Island (2022–present)

Former
Joe Arpaio, Maricopa County, AZ Sheriff (1993–2017)
Carl Paladino, Member of the Buffalo Public Schools Board of Education from the Park District (2013–2017)
Tina Peters, County Clerk and Recorder of Mesa County (2019–2023)
Leticia Remauro, chair of Staten Island Community Board 1 (2009–2015)

International Politicians
Nick Adams, Ashfield, Sydney, Australia councillor (2004–2009)

Party officials
Meshawn Maddock, MI GOP co-chair (2021–present)
Ed Martin, MO GOP Chair (2013–2015)
Anthony Sabatini, Lake County, FL GOP chair (2022–present)

Notable individuals
Scott Adams, creator of Dilbert
Sohrab Ahmari, columnist
Kodak Black, rapper
Eric Branstad, political consultant
Mark Burns, pastor
Colby Covington, mixed martial artist
Johnny Damon, former MLB player
Robert Davi, actor
Diamond, NewsMax host (deceased)
John Dolmayan, System of a Down drummer
Dinesh D'Souza, author and filmmaker
Tony Fabrizio, pollster
 Jerry Falwell Jr., Liberty University president (2007–2020)
Laurence Fox, actor
Ryan Fournier, Students for Trump co-founder
Nick Fuentes, White nationalist political commentator (switched to Kanye West)
Kimberly Guilfoyle, television personality
Chuck Herbster, agribusiness executive
Raheem Kassam, newspaper editor-in-chief
Keemstar, YouTuber
Charlie Kirk, Turning Point USA CEO
Shalabh Kumar, industrialist
Chris LaCivita, political consultant
Kari Lake, news anchor
Mike Lindell, MyPillow CEO
Laura Loomer, anti-Muslim political activist
Timothy Mellon, Pan Am Systems owner
Eric Metaxas, radio host
Michael the Black Man, activist
Tim Michels, Michels Corporation co-owner
Jason Miller, communications strategist
Solomon Peña, former car salesman
Norman Podhoretz, conservative political commentator
Randy Quaid, actor
Phil Robertson, reality TV star
Wayne Allyn Root, TV and radio host
Ned Ryun, American Majority CEO
Antonio Sabàto Jr., actor
Silk, NewsMax host
Roger Stone, political consultant
Christopher Townsend, rapper
Donald Trump Jr., businessman
Eric Trump, businessman
Lara Trump, television producer
Melania Trump, First Lady (2017–2021)
Jon Voight, actor
Susie Wiles, political consultant
L. Lin Wood, attorney

Organizations
California College Republicans
Gays for Trump
LaRouche PAC
National Black Republican Association
National Diversity Coalition for Trump
New York Young Republican Club
Priests for Life
Republican Hindu Coalition
Republicans for National Renewal
Students for Trump
Veterans for America First
Women for America First

Notes

References

Donald Trump 2024 presidential campaign
2024 United States presidential election endorsements